Þórey Rósa Stefánsdóttir (born 14 August 1989) is an Icelandic team handball player. She plays on the Icelandic national team, and participated at the 2011 World Women's Handball Championship in Brazil.

In December 2018, she was named the Icelandic Women's Handball Player of the Year.

References

External links

1989 births
Living people
Thorey Rosa Stefansdottir
Fram women's handball players
21st-century Icelandic women